No Lady is a 1931 British comedy film directed by Lupino Lane and starring Lane, Renee Clama and Sari Maritza. It was made at Lime Grove Studios in Shepherd's Bush by Gaumont British, a company linked to Gainsborough Pictures. The film's sets were designed by art director Andrew Mazzei. It was popular enough to be re-released in 1943. While possibly originally intended to top the bill, it was released as a second feature and is classified as a quota quickie.

Synopsis
While on a family holiday in Blackpool, a mild-mannered man is mistaken for an international spy.
He escapes a brush with the police in women's clothing which he has stolen but discovers a secret letter in the lady's handbag.
This directs him to a meeting with representatives of Ptomania (a thinly-disguised Germany) who are involved in an attempt to sabotage an international glider competition.
Hitler makes a brief appearance as the unnamed pilot of a doomed Ptomanian plane, complete with fringe, toothbrush moustache, and wild gesticulations.
The film has some elements of music hall entertainments in a song and dance routine as well as a number of slapstick moments.  It contains both live action and edited stunt routines.

Partial cast
 Lupino Lane as Mr. Pog  
 Renee Clama as Sonia  
 Sari Maritza as Greta Gherkinski 
 Wallace Lupino as Ptomanian Ptough  
 Lola Hunt as Mrs. Pog 
 Herman Darewski And His Blackpool Tower Band 
 Eddie Jay as Bit Part
 Sam Lee as Bit Part  
 Cyril McLaglen as Bit Part 
 Denis O'Neil as Singer
 Charles Stone as Bit Part

References

Bibliography
 Chibnall, Steve. Quota Quickies: The Birth of the British 'B' Film. British Film Institute, 2007.
Wood, Linda. British Films, 1927–1939. British Film Institute, 1986.

External links

1931 films
1931 comedy films
British comedy films
Films set in Blackpool
Films set in England
Gainsborough Pictures films
Films shot at Lime Grove Studios
Films directed by Lupino Lane
British black-and-white films
Quota quickies
1930s English-language films
1930s British films